WBIG may refer to:

 WBIG (AM), a radio station (1280 AM) licensed to Aurora, Illinois, United States
 WBIG-FM, a radio station (100.3 FM)  licensed to Washington, D.C., United States
 Welsh Benefits Investigation Group
 WBIG (North Carolina), a former radio station located in Greensboro, North Carolina, United States